Solar power has been increasing rapidly in the U.S. state of North Carolina, from less than 1 MW (megawatts) in 2007 to 6,152 MW in 2019, and has the second-largest installed PV capacity of all states. SunEdison built a 17.2-megawatt solar farm in Davidson County.

Because of declining solar panel costs, a 30 percent federal grant known as a 1603 grant was available through December 31, 2011, and a 30 percent tax credit is available through 2019 (declining to 10% by 2022). The federal tax credit is in addition to any local incentives and pays for the cost of installation, which can be rolled over if fewer taxes are owed that year. The difference between a tax deduction and a tax credit is substantial, as a deduction depends on your tax rate to determine your savings, but a tax credit is directly available to repay the cost of installation. A 2012 estimate indicated that a typical 5 kW solar array would pay for itself in 6 years, and thereafter generate a substantial profit. In addition to federal incentives, the state has a Renewable Portfolio Standard of 12.5% by 2021 and a state renewable energy tax credit, both of which have been credited with boosting solar installations.

A 2018 Smithsonian Magazine article described North Carolina as likely being the national leader in the "solar shepherd phenomenon" – combining sheep farming with solar power plants to reduce the high costs of grass trimming.

According to a report from the Solar Energy Industries Association, as of June 2019, North Carolina generates 5.81% of its electricity through solar power, and ranks second (up from 3rd in 2018) in total installed photovoltaics.

Source: NREL

Currently operating

The following tables show some of the major solar power projects currently operating in North Carolina (NC).

Dominion Energy

Duke Energy

Note: Construction completion dates are year or year-month.

Other Generators (20MW+)

Generation 
Using data available from the U.S. Energy Information Agency's Electric Power Annual 2017 and "Electric Power Monthly Data Browser", the following table summarizes North Carolina's solar energy posture.

Capacity factor for each year was computed from the end-of-year summer capacity.
2018 data is from Electric Power Monthly and is subject to change.

Beginning with the 2014 data year, the Energy Information Administration (EIA) has estimated the distributed solar-photovoltaic generation and distributed solar-photovoltaic capacity. These non-utility-scale appraisals evaluate that North Carolina generated the following amounts of additional solar energy:

2014 Duke Energy initiative
On September 15, 2014, Duke Energy committed US$500 million to an expansion of solar power in North Carolina. Announced projects include:
 Warsaw Solar Facility (65 MW) –  Duplin County, developed by Strata Solar. This was scheduled to be the largest PV plant east of the Mississippi River as of the announcement date.
 Elm City Solar Facility (40 MW) – Wilson County, developed by HelioSage Energy
 Fayetteville Solar Facility (23 MW) – Bladen County, developed by Tangent Energy Solutions

In addition, Duke Energy plans to purchase energy from five new projects:
 48 MW – Bladen County, developed by Innovative Solar Systems
 48 MW – Richmond County, developed by FLS Energy
 20 MW – Scotland County, developed by Birdseye Renewable Energy
 19 MW – Cleveland County, developed by Birdseye Renewable Energy
 15 MW – Beaufort County, developed by Element Power US

2015 Completions and proposals
On September 9, 2015, Duke Energy Renewables announced the completion of four solar farms with a combined output totaling 30 MW, in addition to three other farms under construction. These three farms, once completed, will produce an additional 132 MW.

On September 22, 2015, Invenergy Clean Power LLC signed a build-transfer agreement to construct and sell the Morgans Corner solar facility in Pasquotank County to Dominion Energy.

On December 14, 2015 Corning announced that they have entered into a Power Purchasing Agreement (PPA) for solar-generated electricity produced by Duke Energy Renewables at the Conetoe II facility. Corning will purchase 62.5% of the expected output (estimated at 120,300 MWh/yr) beginning in the first quarter of 2016.

On December 16, 2015 Woodland Town Council leaders rejected the proposed solar farm in Northampton County due to local opposition. A concern cited at the council meeting was that "photosynthesis would not happen" around installed panels and questions about high cancer rates in the area were raised with one resident being quoted as saying "no one could tell her that solar panels didn't cause cancer".

2016 Completions and proposals
In 2016 Duke Energy added about 500 MW of solar capacity in North Carolina. This includes 100 MW from Duke's own commercial and regulated businesses and 400 MW from projects built by other developers. This addition has the capacity to provide 105,000 homes with electricity during peak production. Plans for 2017 include the addition of around 400 MW including the completion of the 60 MW Monroe farm in Union County.

On February 1, 2016 Lockheed Martin announced that they had entered into a Power Purchasing Agreement (PPA) for the remaining 37.5% of solar-generated electricity produced by Duke Energy Renewables at the Conetoe II facility.

In April 2016, Currituck County commissioners denying Ecoplexus's requests for both conditional rezoning and a use permit for building a solar farm on the former Goose Creek Golf Course in Gandy.

2017 Completions and proposals
In 2017 Duke Energy added about 500 MW of solar capacity in North Carolina. This included the completion of the Monroe facility and a 29 MW facility in Davie County.

In March 2017, Chief Resident Superior Court Judge Jerry Tillett upheld Currituck County's 2016 denial of an Ecoplexus's bid to build a solar farm (Sunshine Farms) on a former golf course in Grandy

On May 4, 2017, Dominion Energy announced that it had planned to purchase a 79 MW solar energy facility under construction in Anson County from Cypress Creek Renewables.

In June 2017, The Board of Adjustment in Cabarrus County approved a conditional use permit for McBride Place Energy, LLC, to build a solar farm on property just north of Midland off of U.S. 601.

On August 3, 2017, Dominion Energy announced that it had acquired two 5 MW facilities (Fremont in Wayne County and Moorings 2 in Lenoir County) and expected to purchase two other 5 MW facilities (Clipperton in Sampson County and Pikeville in Wayne County) from Strata Solar.

On December 19, 2017, a three-judge panel of the North Carolina Court of Appeals overturned Currituck County's denial of the proposed Sunshine Farm.

2018 Completions and proposals

Dominion Investments
On January 10, 2018, Dominion Energy announced that they would be investing $1 billion in their solar fleet in Virginia and North Carolina.

Duke Energy rebate proposal
On January 22, 2018, Duke Energy Renewables proposed a $62 million rebate program for both residential and nonresidential customers. It was the first of three programs Duke is proposing as part of "Competitive Energy Solutions for North Carolina" legislation, signed into law in 2017 by Gov. Roy Cooper. The program requires approval from the North Carolina Utilities Commission.

Customers would also have the option of leasing solar equipment from a third-party.

On April 16, 2018, the North Carolina Utilities Commission approved the program. It applies to Duke Energy's residential, nonresidential and nonprofit customers who installed a solar system and a bi-directional meter on their property on or after January 1, 2018.

Bertie County Groundbreaking
On March 26, 2018 Fifth Third Bank and SunEnergy1 broke ground on a solar farm in Aulander. The facility is expected to create at least 1,000 jobs, and generate 194,000 mega-watt hours of electricity annually.

Recurrent Energy
On May 21, 2018, Recurrent Energy announced that they had secured $106 million in financing to build a 75 MW facility near Concord in Cabarrus County.

Currituck County Approval
In June 2018, Ecoplexus received a permit from the Currituck Commission to build a solar farm south of Grandy, located at the former Goose Creek Golf Course. The permit allows for up to a 20-megawatt facility, with construction expected to start at the end of this 2018, and completion expected to be by mid-2019.

Proposals

Rowan County
In September 2019, China Grove Solar proposed to develop a 428-acre, 65-megawatt, ground-mounted solar farm located in Rowan County.

See also
Solar power in the United States
Renewable energy in the United States

External links
North Carolina solar calculator
Renewable energy policies and incentives

References

Energy in North Carolina
North Carolina